Parmaylovo (Parmajyl) is a rural locality (a village) in Yukseyevskoye Rural Settlement, Kochyovsky District, Perm Krai, Russia. The population was 40 as of 2010. There are 3  streets. Parmaylovo is home to an open air Museum of Wooden sculptures created by local artist Yegor Utrobin.

Geography 
Parmaylovo is located 36 km north of Kochyovo (the district's administrative centre) by road. Mitino is the nearest rural locality.

References 

Rural localities in Kochyovsky District